Marshall County Schools is a school district headquartered in the Draffenville area of unincorporated Marshall County, Kentucky, near Benton. It serves all of Marshall County.

Schools
 High schools
 Marshall County High School
 Star Academy High School
 Middle schools
 North Marshall
 South Marshall
 Elementary schools
 Benton
 Calvert City
 Central
 Jonathan
 Sharpe
 South Marshall

References

External links
 
School districts in Kentucky
Marshall County, Kentucky